The SOS Tour is the ongoing second concert tour by American singer-songwriter SZA, in support of her second studio album, SOS (2022). It is her first arena tour, with 19 planned shows across the United States and Canada. Omar Apollo serves as the concerts' opening act.

Background 

After the release of SZA's debut studio album Ctrl in 2017, her second, SOS, was highly awaited. This was in large part due to Ctrl critical acclaim, as well as the five-year-long wait and the several delays that occurred surrounding SOS release. In November 2022, SZA told Billboard that the album would come out the following month. She posted the track list via Twitter on December 5, and SOS was released four days later to critical and commercial success.

In promotion of SOS, SZA announced merchandise for the album on December 13. At the same time, she revealed she would tour North America in early 2023 in support of the album. She wrote on Instagram, "Time to take this shit on the road!" Tickets went on sale via SZA's website on December 16, at 12 pm Eastern Time, with pre-sales hosted by Ticketmaster one day beforehand. Several publications called the tour one of 2023's most anticipated; some cited the critical acclaim of SOS and the years-long wait for SZA's album.

With Omar Apollo announced as the opening act, the SOS Tour is SZA's and Apollo's first arena tour and her first concert tour since Ctrl the Tour ended in 2018. It consists of shows across 17 cities in Canada and the United States. The first concert was on February 21, 2023, at the Schottestein Center in Columbus, Ohio; and the last is on March 23, 2023, at the Kia Forum in Inglewood, California. The Inglewood stop features back-to-back concerts alongside the one at Madison Square Garden in New York City, resulting in a total of 19 shows. The concert in Philadelphia, Pennsylvania, scheduled for March 3 at the Wells Fargo Center, was postponed to an unknown date.

Concert synopsis 
The SOS Tour's concerts were around 90 minutes long. Set lists often had over 30 songs, with slight adjustments per show to ensure all standard tracks from SOS were performed. Apart from such tracks, she performed "PSA" (2023), which appears on the web-exclusive version of SOS; and various songs from Ctrl such as "Love Galore" (2017), "Broken Clocks" (2018), and "Garden (Say It like Dat)" (2018). She also included covers of "Bag Lady" (2000) by Erykah Badu and her collaborations with other artists, namely "All the Stars" (2018) with Kendrick Lamar and "Kiss Me More" (2021) with Doja Cat. Select shows featured surprise guests; most were artists with whom SZA had worked on songs in the past.

SZA said the SOS Tour's aesthetic was inspired by Disney films—a "Cinderella moment where there’s weird, ethereal, mystical, soft things" combined with a "hardcore edge"—demonstrated through her costumes and the stage effects. For the shows' third outfit, SZA wore a yellow tulle gown while performing a medley of "Supermodel" (2017), "Special" (2022), and "Nobody Gets Me" (2023), reminiscent of the character Belle from Beauty and the Beast (1991). Apart from this and Cinderella (1950), the stage design and costumes took inspiration from other Disney films such as Aladdin (1992), Treasure Planet (2002) and The Little Mermaid (1989).

The concerts featured prominent nautical visual elements. They began with SZA's recreation of the album's cover art, which shows her atop a diving board in the middle of the ocean with an "S" jersey. She dove into the stage once the first song, "PSA", began, and when she sang "Shirt" (2022), a "puddled blue orb" followed her across the stage while the screen showed an underwater visual. After a brief costume change backed by "Smoking on My Ex Pack" (2022), SZA appeared on top of a life-sized sailboat beside a pier. Following a performance of her rock song "F2F" (2022), in which she and her guitarist headbanged to channel a mosh pit, the screen and stage floor projected a scene of a turbulent sea, leading her to retreat to a floating life raft.

SZA performed the medley as the raft transported her across the venue; the storm-themed backdrop ended once she reached the other side. There, she did another costume change. She wore red biker pants and a motor suit with a spiked ball and chain in hand, recreating her outfit in the music video for "Kill Bill" (2023). Her prop was a callback to a scene in Kill Bill: Volume 1 (2003) where Gogo Yubari fought the protagonist, the Bride, at the House of Blue Leaves using a meteor hammer. SZA concluded the show with the encore song "Good Days" (2020), back on the diving board as the screen projected a scene of the sun either rising or setting. After the concerts ended, the screen showed a teaser of an upcoming music video for the SOS track "Low" (2022), which depicts SZA as she operates a flamethrower.

Set list
This set list is from the Columbus show. It is not intended to represent all dates throughout the tour.

 
"PSA"
"Seek & Destroy"
"Notice Me"
"Conceited"
"Love Galore"
"Broken Clocks"
"Forgiveless"
"Used"
"Bag Lady" (Erykah Badu cover)
"Blind"
"Shirt"
"Too Late"
"Smoking on My Ex Pack"
"All the Stars"
"Prom"
"Garden (Say It like Dat)"
"F2F"
"Drew Barrymore"
"Doves in the Wind"
"Low"
"Open Arms"
"Supermodel"
"Special"
"Nobody Gets Me"
"Gone Girl"
"SOS"
"Kiss Me More"
"Love Language"
"Snooze"
"Kill Bill"
"I Hate U"
"The Weekend"
Encore
 "Good Days"

Surprise guests 
The following is a list of surprise special guests that accompanied SZA during the SOS Tour. A dagger indicates a collaboration between SZA and the guest.

 March 4, 2023 – Madison Square Garden: Phoebe Bridgers for "Ghost in the Machine" (2022), and Cardi B for "I Do" (2017) and "Tomorrow 2" (2022)
 March 7, 2023 – State Farm Arena: Summer Walker for "No Love" (2022), and Lil Baby for "Forever" (2022)

Tour dates

Postponed concerts

Notes

References 

2023 concert tours
Concert tours of Canada
Concert tours of the United States